East Wind was a Japanese jazz record label that was established in Tokyo in 1974.

A second record label named East Wind was established in Hartford, Connecticut, in 1984. The founders were David Barrick, Steve Boulay, Ted Everts, and Gerald A. Friedman. The label concentrated on Russian jazz.

Discography

Albums

References

External links
Great Jazz Trio at Discogs
East Wind at Discogs

Jazz record labels
Japanese record labels